The BGN/PCGN romanization system for Belarusian is a method for romanization of Cyrillic Belarusian texts, that is, their transliteration into the Latin alphabet.  

There are a number of systems for romanization of Belarusian, but the BGN/PCGN system is relatively intuitive for anglophones to pronounce. It is part of the larger set of BGN/PCGN romanizations, which includes methods for 29 different languages. It was developed by the United States Board on Geographic Names and by the Permanent Committee on Geographical Names for British Official Use. The portion of the system pertaining to the Belarusian language was jointly adopted by BGN and PCGN in 1979.

This romanization of Belarusian can be rendered by using only the basic letters and punctuation found on English-language keyboards: no diacritics or unusual letters are required, but the interpunct character (·) is optionally used to avoid some ambiguity.

The following table describes the system and provides examples.

References

See also
Belarusian language
Belarusian Latin alphabet
Romanization of Belarusian
List of cities in Belarus

Romanization of Cyrillic
BGN/PCGN romanization
Belarusian language